Jørgen Breder Faye (7 June 1823 – 2 August 1908) was a Norwegian banker and politician.

Biography
Faye was born in Bergen, Norway. He was the son of Christen Faye (1781-1836) and Magdalene Christine Wiese (1791-1878). His father was a master baker who died when Faye was thirteen years of age. Following the death of his father,  Faye worked for his mother's brother Georg Wiese, who operated a brewery in the commercial district of  Finnegården in Bryggen.  He took over the uncle's business in 1846.

Faye worked as a merchant at Bryggen until he in 1856 was appointed chief executive officer of the newly created commercial bank Bergens Privatbank; a position he held until 1903. He sat in the Bergen city council from 1851 and was mayor in 1862.
 

He was elected to represent Bergen in the Norwegian Parliament, sitting for three periods in 1856-58, 1865-67 and 1868-71.

Honors
Knight of the Order of St. Olav in 1857, Command Cross in 1891 and Commander 1st grade in 1895 
Knight of the Swedish Order of the Polar Star

References

1823 births
1908 deaths
Businesspeople from Bergen
Norwegian bankers
Members of the Storting
Mayors of Bergen
Knights of the Order of the Polar Star
 Recipients of the St. Olav's Medal
Politicians from Bergen